Irma Schrameková (born 20 February 1912, date of death unknown) was a Czech swimmer. She competed in two events at the 1936 Summer Olympics.

References

External links
 

1912 births
Year of death missing
Czech female swimmers
Olympic swimmers of Czechoslovakia
Swimmers at the 1936 Summer Olympics
Place of birth missing